Whyman is a surname. Notable people with the surname include:

Alfred Whyman (1884–?), English footballer
Djaran Whyman (born 1983), Australian rules footballer
Erica Whyman (born 1969), English theatre director
Kevin Whyman (1975–2015), English rower
Matt Whyman (born 1969), English writer
Phil Whyman (born 1971), English musician

See also
Dayna Berghan-Whyman, New Zealand medieval fighter
Jada Mathyssen-Whyman (born 1999), Australian soccer player